Eunidia quadricincta is a species of beetle in the family Cerambycidae. It was described by Per Olof Christopher Aurivillius in 1911. It is known from Tanzania, Ethiopia, Somalia, and Kenya.

References

Eunidiini
Beetles described in 1911